The Heydar Aliyev Center is a  building complex in Baku, Azerbaijan designed by Iraqi-British architect Zaha Hadid and noted for its distinctive architecture and flowing, curved style that eschews sharp angles. The center is named after Heydar Aliyev (1923–2003), the first secretary of Soviet Azerbaijan from 1969 to 1982, and president of Azerbaijan Republic from October 1993 to October 2003.

Design

In 2007, Zaha Hadid was appointed as the design architect of the Center after a competition. The Center houses a conference hall (auditorium), a gallery hall and a museum. The project is intended to play an integral role in the intellectual life of the city. Located close to the city center, the site plays a pivotal role in the redevelopment of Baku.

The Heydar Aliyev Center represents a fluid form which emerges by the folding of the landscape's natural topography and by the wrapping of individual functions of the Center. All functions of the Center, together with entrances, are represented by folds in a single continuous surface. This fluid form gives an opportunity to connect the various cultural spaces whilst at the same time, providing each element of the Center with its own identity and privacy. As it folds inside, the skin erodes away to become an element of the interior landscape of the Center.

Heydar Aliyev Center had an official soft-opening ceremony on 10 May 2012 held by current president of Azerbaijan Ilham Aliyev.

An internationally recognized architectural work, the building of the Heydar Aliyev Center has become a signature landmark of modern Baku due to its innovative and cutting-edge design. Extending on eight floor levels, the center accommodates a 1000-seat auditorium, temporary exhibition spaces, a conference center, workshops, and a museum.

The building was nominated for awards in 2013 at both the World Architecture Festival and the biennial Inside Festival. In 2014, the Center won the Design Museum's Design of the Year Award 2014 despite concerns about the site's human rights record. This makes Zaha Hadid the first woman to win the top prize in that competition.

In popular culture 
The building was featured in Extreme Engineering, a documentary television series that airs on the Discovery Channel and the Science Channel. The episode called "Azerbaijan's Amazing Transformation" was aired on April 22, 2011 as part of Season 9. The Building was also featured on the "postcard" of Samra Rahimli for the postcard of Azerbaijan at the Eurovision Song Contest 2016 and in a Google Doodle in 2017.

On June 29, 2012, the Heydar Aliyev Center held the official opening of Crans Montana Forum, attended by President of Azerbaijan Ilham Aliyev, President of Georgia Mikheil Saakashvili, President of Macedonia Gjorge Ivanov, President of Montenegro Filip Vujanović, as well as foreign public figures, MPs, intellectuals, and business circles.

On July 3, 2012, the Center held the ceremony of the official seeing-off of the Azerbaijani delegation to take part in the 2012 Summer Olympic Games in London. The ceremony was attended by the President Republic of Azerbaijan, President of the National Olympic Committee Ilham Aliyev and his spouse Mehriban Aliyeva. Photo banners reflecting the Olympic movement in Azerbaijan were installed in the lobby of the Heydar Aliyev Center. President of Azerbaijan Ilham Aliyev made a speech at the ceremony.

On 20 July 2012, a fire started on the roof of the building at about 11:30am. It was quickly put out by firemen, and it was initially reported that the fire only damaged the roof of the building, leaving the interior only slightly damaged, mainly because of the water used by firemen to extinguish the fire. The fire was found to have resulted from negligence in the use of welding equipment in the roof; three Turkish contractors were subsequently charged under Azerbaijan's criminal code. The resulting damage was found to have had "grave consequences and material damage on a large scale". Subsequent to sixteen months of repairs, it was formally (re)opened on November 5, 2013.

On Nov. 2 and 3, 2013, Moscow music theater “Helikon-Opera” under the direction of People's Artist of Russia Dmitry Bertman presented performances at the Heydar Aliyev Center. On Nov. 2, the “Helikon-Opera” presented a gala concert “The Enduring Love”, a program that included lyric songs by Marilyn Monroe, Tina Turner, Elton John, Celine Dion, Whitney Houston, “The Beatles”, with “All You Need is Love”, “I believe in Love”, ”Je Suis Malade”, “Only You”, “Lady in Red”, “Love me Tender” performed. On Nov.3, the artists of the theater performed the opera “Siberia” by the Italian composer Umberto Giordano staged by Dmitry Bertmann. The opera narrates the story of love between two young people, which starts at brilliant imperial St. Petersburg and ends tragically in hard labor in Siberia.

Exhibitions

“Life, Death, and Beauty” 
On June 21, 2013, the Center held the exhibition of works by American artist Andy Warhol titled “Life, Death, and Beauty” supervised by Gianni Mercurio, dated for the 85th anniversary of the artist. The exhibition for the first time in Azerbaijan displayed over one hundred works by the artist, including featurettes by Warhol. There were shown photos of the author, portraits of the world film, music, and fashion stars, as well as other world-renowned works, including "Flowers"  "Camouflage", “The Last Supper”, “Male Hands Praying”, “Electric Chair”, etc. On August 6, the artist's birthday, Baku residents and visitors could freely visit the exhibition, which ran till September 9.

“At the turn of the century” 
On October 1, 2013, the Heydar Aliyev Center held a personal exhibition of the People's Artist of Azerbaijan, vice-president of the Russian Academy of Arts Tahir Salahov titled “At the turn of the century”. The exhibition was dated for the 85th anniversary of the artist. His great contribution to the development of the Azerbaijani fine art was highlighted at the exhibition opening. The artistic heritage of Tahir Salahov is an integral part of the art of not only Azerbaijan, but also the entire former Soviet Union. He is recognized as one of the founders of the “severe style” in painting. The exhibition featured over 100 works by the artist, created at different times, and his works on the carpets. Among the exhibits were the portraits of Heydar Aliyev, the composer Gara Garayev and Dmitri Shostakovich, the musician Mstislav Rostropovich, the works “Aidan”, “Morning. Absheron”, ”Koroglu”, Absheron triptych – “Ateshgah”, “The Caspian today”, “Maiden Tower”, and other well-known works of the people’s artist. The exhibition ran till November 8.

In 2017 the center has also opened its doors to the Contemporary Turkish Art Exhibition, a collection of art pieces by various Turkish artists.

“Masterpieces of History” exhibition 
On May 27, 2019, Heydar Aliyev Center hosted The Historic Masterpieces Exhibition, which included ancient artifacts from Georgia and Azerbaijan.

Majority of artifacts belong to Gajar epoch and are worldwide known ceramic and metal works, canvases, miniatures and belongings of Fatali Khan, including his portrait.

The exhibition also featured photographic collection by Dmitri Yermakov, a participant of the Russian-Ottoman War of 1877-1878.

"Hyperrealistic Sculpture. Almost Alive" exhibition

On November 29, 2018, Almost Alive exhibition was held at the Heydar Aliyev Center. The exhibition consisted of deformed figures of extraordinary dimensions, monochrome statues, pieces representing various body parts.

The exhibition features works created by Daniel Firman, Duane Hanson, Tony Matelli, Mel Ramos, Mathilde ter Heijne, Robert Graham, Allen Jones, Zharko Basheski, George Segal and other artists.

“Possible Dimensions” exhibition 
On May 22, Zurab Tsereteli opened an exhibition at Heydar Aliyev Center. Exhibition was dedicated to Zurab Tsereteli’s 85th anniversary. 30 paintings and statues brought from Moscow, Tbilisi and London are displayed at the exhibition.

Vienna Strauss Festival Orchestra 
On November 26, Strauss Festival Orchestra Vienna held a concert at Heydar Aliyev Center. Concert was held with full house. The Strauss Festival Orchestra Vienna also appeared with concerts at the Heydar Aliyev Center back in 2014 and 2016.

“Inner Engineering: Technologies for Wellbeing” lecture by Sadguru 
Jaggi Vasudev, also known as Sadguru gave a lecture in Heydar Aliyev Center on November 10. The subject constitutes a comprehensive system derived from centuries-old yoga studies aiming at profound and sustainable personal transformation.

Mini Azerbaijan 
The Mini Azerbaijan exhibition on the second floor features models of 24 historical and architectural buildings. Visitors can also learn about the history and architecture of buildings exhibited both in Azerbaijani and English.

Among exhibited buildings, there are buildings dated to the Middle Ages (Maiden Tower, Momine Khatun Mausoleum), 19th century (Baku Bazaar, Azerbaijan State Philharmonic Hall, Ismailiyya Palace), USSR era (Government House, Green Theatre), 21st century (Baku Crystal Hall, Flame Towers) as well as the buildings being constructed (Baku Olympic Stadium, State Oil Fund of the Republic of Azerbaijan).

International relations 
The Heydar Aliyev Center maintains close ties with a number of international agencies, peer structures abroad, museums and exhibition centers. The Center has organized events and exhibitions as a result of joint cooperation with different organization, museums and exhibitions of Austria, Belgium, Great Britain, France, Italy, Russia, Slovenia, Turkey and so on. At the same time, it has conducted a number of projects in Great Britain, Israel, Italy, Hungary, Romania, Russia, Turkey, Japan and others. Center has become a member of various international organizations.

The International Association of Exhibitions and Events (IAEE)

The Association's major goal is to provide support to the agencies involved in the organization of events and exhibitions through resources and information, and the development of the exhibition industry. The Center enjoys the IAEE membership as of September 17, 2013.

The International Congress and Convention Association (ICCA)

The ICCA is the world s leading association in the field of organizing and accommodating international events with 90 member states at the moment. The Center became the ICCA member as of October 10, 2013.

The International Association of Convention Centers (AIPC)

The Association the Center acceded as of September 15, 2014 unites professional managers of convention centers and exhibitions halls, with more than 50 member states currently represented.

The Association of Event Organizers (AEO)

The association unites organizations involved in the management, operation and sales of events. Sharing best practices in security and sustainability matters, as well as technical and financial issues,  constitutes the major objective of the AEO, with the Heydar Aliyev Center being a member to as of December 15, 2014.

References

External links

 Official website
 Photos: Construction Process at Heydar Aliyev Center
 Heydar Aliyev Center publications at Archidust

2012 establishments in Azerbaijan
Buildings and structures in Baku
Culture in Baku
Zaha Hadid buildings
Tourist attractions in Baku
Museums established in 2012
Performing arts centres
Neo-futurism architecture